

The Aerosport Woody Pusher is a two-seat parasol wing monoplane designed for home building by Harris Woods, based closely on the Curtiss Junior. First marketed in the 1960s, at least 27 were flying by 1980.

One is on display at the Wings Over the Rockies Air and Space Museum, Denver, Colorado, with a 75-hp Continental engine (No. N393EA). Another, N100FQ, is displayed at the Florida Air Museum, Lakeland, Florida.

Specifications

See also
Curtiss-Wright Junior

References

 
 
 Sun 'n Fun Museum website

Woody Pusher
1960s United States civil utility aircraft
Homebuilt aircraft
Single-engined pusher aircraft
Parasol-wing aircraft